Harm Osmers (born 28 January 1985) is a German football referee who is based in Hanover. He referees for SV Baden of the Lower Saxony Football Association. He is a FIFA referee, and is ranked as a UEFA first category referee.

Refereeing career
Osmers began as a referee at his hometown club SV Baden and in 2001 became a B-youth referee. In 2009, he became a DFB referee, and was appointed as a 2. Bundesliga referee in 2011. Since 2011, he also serves as an assistant referee and fourth official in the Bundesliga. On 15 July 2015, he made an international debut as an assistant for Daniel Siebert for the UEFA Champions League qualifier between Celtic and Stjarnan. In the summer of 2016, Osmers was one of four referees promoted to officiate in the Bundesliga.

Personal life
Osmers has a diploma in business administration and works as an investment controller in Hanover.

References

External links
 Harm Osmers at DFB.de 
 Harm Osmers at WorldFootball.net

1985 births
Living people
German football referees
Sportspeople from Bremen